Sardinella jussieu (Mauritian sardinella or goldstripe sardinella) is a species of ray-finned fish in the genus Sardinella.

Footnotes 
 

jussieu
Fish described in 1803